The Australian Universities Quality Agency (AUQA) was established in 2000, and was the government body responsible for providing audit of higher education institutions in Australia. AUQA was jointly established in 2000 as an independent quality agency by Federal, State & Territory Governments through the Ministerial Council for Education, Employment and Youth Affairs (MCEETYA). AUQA was in some respects a successor to the Committee for Quality Assurance in Higher Education (CQAHE)(1992-1995) and the Commonwealth Tertiary Education Commission (CTEC) that came before it (1977-1988).

AUQA was dissolved in 2011 and its functions were transferred to the Tertiary Education Quality and Standards Agency (TEQSA). TEQSA's implementation reflects a move away from the 'fitness-for-purpose' approach employed by AUQA to one premised on regulation and risk.

References

2000 establishments in Australia
2011 disestablishments in Australia
Government agencies established in 2000
Government agencies disestablished in 2011
Higher education in Australia
Accreditation organizations
Higher education accreditation
Oversight and watchdog organizations
Educational organisations based in Australia
Defunct Commonwealth Government agencies of Australia